Yuxarı Ağcayazı (also, Yukhari Agdzhayazy and Yukhary Agdzhayazy) a village and municipality in the Agdash Rayon of Azerbaijan. It has a population of 1,171. The municipality consists of the villages of Yuxarı Ağcayazı and Aşağı Ağcayazı.

References 

Populated places in Agdash District